Galliffet or gallifet were a style of trousers in military uniform of the Soviet Army. They were similar to riding breeches, fit for jackboots. Russian dictionaries define "galife" as pants fitting the knees and below, to easily fit the sapogi (Russian jackboots), and expanding from above the knees.

They were named after French general Gaston Alexandre Auguste, Marquis de Galliffet.

See also
 
Uniforms of the Russian Armed Forces

References

Soviet military uniforms
Trousers and shorts
Eponyms